The Caesars Belmont Derby is an American Grade I stakes race for three-year-old Thoroughbred race horse run over a distance of  miles on the turf at Belmont Park in July. The purse for the event is US$1,000,000. The event is the first of three of the "Turf Trinity" which was inaugurated in 2019.

Race history
In 2014, the race became a feature portion of the Stars and Stripes Racing Festival at Belmont Park. The race was renamed from the Jamaica Handicap, moved from October to July, increased in distance from  miles to  miles, and had the purse increased from $500,000 to $1,250,000.

The original race name was named after the Jamaica District in Queens, New York. The first running took place in 1929 at the Jamaica Race Course. When the Jamaica track closed in 1959, the race was shifted to the Aqueduct Race Track in Queens where it was contested in 1960, 1975 to 1977, 1979 to 1981, and 1987.

It was raced at a distance of six furlongs from 1929 to 1953 and 1957 to 1960, then at  miles (9 furlongs) in 1954, and from 1997 through 2014.

The Jamaica Handicap was open to horses age three and older from 1929 to 1944, 1949 to 1953, and again in 1960.  It has been a turf race since 1994.

The Jamaica wasn't run from 1933 to 1935, in 1955 and 1956, from 1961 to 1976, nor in 1995 (due to severe weather conditions). It was run in two divisions in 1946.

In 2009, the Jamaica became a Grade I event.

Of interest is that any horse winning three editions of a single race is a rare occurrence but the Jamaica Handicap had two horses accomplish that feat when it was open to older horses.

Records

Belmont Derby  / Jamaica Handicap 
Speed  record: (at current distance of  miles)
 1:58.29 – Henley's Joy (2019)

Most wins:
 3 – Overdrawn (1941, 1942, 1943)
 3 – Piet (1949, 1950, 1951)

Most wins by an owner:
 4 – George D. Widener Jr. (1931, 1936, 1941, 1942)

Most wins by a jockey:
 4 – Richard Migliore (1984, 1986, 1996, 2004)

Most wins by a trainer:

 3 – R. Emmett Potts (1949, 1950, 1951)
 3 – Bert Mulholland (1936, 1941, 1942)
 3 – C. R. McGaughey III (1987, 1990, 2014)
 3 – William I. Mott (2000, 2003, 2008)

Winners 

 * In 1954 Tea-maker, who won this race in 1952, finished first again but was disqualified.

See also
List of American and Canadian Graded races

References

External links
 The Belmont Derby Invitational Stakes at Pedigree Query Thoroughbred Database – First three placegetters

Grade 1 stakes races in the United States
Flat horse races for three-year-olds
Horse races in New York (state)
Turf races in the United States
Recurring sporting events established in 1929
Belmont Park
Jamaica Race Course
1929 establishments in New York (state)